Oman was the host nation for the 2010 Asian Beach Games which is being held in Almusannah and Muscat from 8 December to 16 December 2010 .
Oman teams have 83 athletes ( 75 men and 8 women ) competing in 12 sports .

Competitors

Medals table

Medalists

External links 
Official Site

References

Oman medals page
 Oman number of entries by sport

Nations at the 2010 Asian Beach Games
2010
Asian Beach Games